Sunday Omony is an Ugandan-Canadian plus-size model and activist.

Career
Omony hosted Canada's Miss Exotika beauty pageant in 2013. She worked as a procurement analyst in the oil industry.

Modeling
Omony started modeling when she was sixteen. She was first spotted by a Mode Models agent in 2002 at a career fair. She modeled for African magazines FabAfriq and Tropics. She has modeled for Italian Vogue, Old Navy and the Heart and Stroke Foundation of Canada.

She started losing weight when she first started modeling, pressured to be skinny by industry standards. Instead, she became a full-time plus-size model. She has been interviewed on the CBC's Daybreak Alberta about her plus-size modeling and activism.

Humanitarian
Omony started the non-profit organization Immigrant Youth Empowerment Society in 2004. The mission of the organization is to empower young people in their neighborhoods around education and family life. She also works with the FEED1 Project, Hearts 4 Peace, and the Heart and Stroke Foundation of Canada. Omony had her own TV show, the Sunday Omony Show, which aired on Shaw TV.

Personal life
Omony was born in the Kitgum District of Uganda before moving to Canada when she was 6. She is the oldest of four siblings. In 1991, she moved to Canada. She lives in Calgary, Alberta. Omony is studying for a bachelor's degree in Communications and Culture from the University of Calgary.

In early 2017, Omony made allegations of racial profiling against members of the Calgary Police Service after being pulled over on suspicion of impaired driving. Her claims were proven false with video evidence that she was driving erratically and that she failed to stop for over 20 blocks for a  marked police vehicle with lights and sirens. It was proven that the officers in question treated her in a professional, courteous manner, that her claims were categorically false and that she was attempting to enflame racial tension between visible minorities and the C.P.S. She later deleted her inflammatory posts and offered an apology.

References

External links

TEDxYYC talk

Living people
Canadian female models
Canadian humanitarians
People from Calgary
People from Kitgum District
Plus-size models
Ugandan emigrants to Canada
Place of birth missing (living people)
Year of birth missing (living people)